Harry Clifford Francis "Yip" Foster (November 25, 1907 — June 4, 1978) was a Canadian ice hockey player who played for the Detroit Red Wings, Boston Bruins and New York Rangers in the National Hockey League between 1929 and 1935. The rest of his career, which lasted from 1927 to 1947, was spent in various minor leagues. He also played Canadian football (the known as rugby football) with the Toronto Balmy Beach Beachers of the Ontario Rugby Football Union from 1924 to 1930, and won the Grey Cup in 1927. Prior to his playing career Foster attended  Malvern Collegiate Institute.

In later years, Foster owned and ran a grocery store with his family in Wayne Michigan.

Career statistics

Regular season and playoffs

References

External links
 

1907 births
1978 deaths
Boston Bruins players
Boston Cubs players
Boston Tigers (CAHL) players
Canadian ice hockey defencemen
Cleveland Barons (1937–1973) players
Cleveland Falcons players
Detroit Metal Mouldings players
Detroit Olympics (IHL) players
Detroit Red Wings players
Hershey Bears players
Ice hockey people from Ontario
Minneapolis Millers (AHA) players
New York Rangers players
Ontario Rugby Football Union players
Players of Canadian football from Ontario
St. Paul Greyhounds players
Sportspeople from Guelph
Springfield Indians players
Syracuse Stars (AHL) players
Toronto Balmy Beach Beachers players
Canadian expatriate ice hockey players in the United States